The 1922–23 season was the 46th Scottish football season in which Dumbarton competed at national level, entering the Scottish Football League and the Scottish Cup.  In addition Dumbarton entered the Dumbartonshire Cup and the Dumbartonshire Charity Cup.

Scottish League

In their first season back in the Second Division for a decade, Dumbarton finished 4th, out of 18, with 42 points - 15 behind champions Queen's Park.  A poor away record and the inability to win against their closest rivals at the top of the league were the main reasons for the promotion challenge failing.

Scottish Cup

In the Scottish Cup, Dumbarton were knocked out in the first round by Dunfermline Athletic.

Dumbartonshire Cup
Dumbarton retained the Dumbartonshire Cup by going through the league phase and the final with a 100% record.

Dumbartonshire Charity Cup
Dumbarton continued the local success by retaining the Dumbartonshire Charity Cup, defeating Clydebank in the final.

Friendly

Player statistics

|}

Source:

Transfers

Players in

Players out 

Source:

In addition James Forrest, Charles Gordon, James Robertson and Alexander Shedden all played their final 'first XI' games in Dumbarton colours.

References

Dumbarton F.C. seasons
Scottish football clubs 1922–23 season